Marie Lohr (28 July 1890 – 21 January 1975) was an Australian-born actress, active on stage and in film in Britain. During a career of more than 60 years she  created roles in plays by, among others, Bernard Shaw, J. M. Barrie, Frederick Lonsdale, Somerset Maugham, William Douglas-Home and Noël Coward. She appeared mainly in the West End, but toured the British provinces at intervals throughout her career, appeared in Broadway productions and toured Canada.

Biography
Marie Löhr was born in Sydney, New South Wales, to Lewis J. Löhr, treasurer of the Melbourne opera house, and his wife, the English actress Kate Bishop (1848–1923).  Her maternal uncle Alfred Bishop and her godparents, William and Madge Kendal, were also actors. She married Anthony Leyland Prinsep, a theatrical producer, at St-Martin-in-the-Fields in 1912. They divorced in 1928. They had one child. On the death of Dame Madge Kendal in 1935, Lohr inherited their property at Filey.

Lohr died at the age of 84, and was buried in the Brompton Cemetery in west London.

Career
Lohr's first stage appearance was in Sydney, aged four, in The World Against Her. Her London debut (after the family's move to Britain), was at age ten, in Shockheaded Peter as well as The Man Who Stole the Castle. (Shockheaded Peter starred Lohr's mother and George Grossmith Jr., and was produced at the Garrick Theatre in 1900.) The run was curtailed by the death of Queen Victoria, and brought back in 1901, a critic commented "one little actress, 'A Child', represented by Miss Marie Lohr, I think, being particularly good". Her subsequent stage career was:

Films and television

The Real Thing at Last (1916, Short) – Murdered Woman
Victory and Peace (1918) – Barbara Rowntree
Aren't We All? (1932) – Lady Frinton
Lady in Danger (1934) – Lady Brockley
Road House (1934) – Lady Hamble
Mon Coeur t'Appelle (1934, English version: My Heart is Calling You) – Modiste
My Heart is Calling (1935) – Manageress of Dress Salon
Oh, Daddy! (1935) – Lady Linda Pye
Royal Cavalcade (1935) – Mother
Fighting Stock (1935) – Mrs. Barbara Rivers
Cock o' the North (1935) – Mary Barton
Foreign Affaires (1935) – Mrs. Cope
Whom the Gods Love: The Original Story of Mozart and His Wife (1936) – the Empress
Dreams Come True (1936) – Helen von Waldenau
Reasonable Doubt (1936)
It's You I Want (1936) – Constance Gilbert
South Riding (1938) – Mrs. Beddows
Pygmalion (1938) – Mrs. Higgins
A Gentleman's Gentleman (1939) – Mrs. Handside-Lane
George and Margaret (1940) – Alice
Major Barbara (1941) – Lady Britomart
Went the Day Well? (1942) – Mrs. Fraser
Kiss the Bride Goodbye (1945) – Emma Blood
Twilight Hour (1945) – Lady Chetwood
The Rake's Progress (1945) – Lady Angela Parks
The Magic Bow (1946) – Countess de Vermond
The Ghosts of Berkeley Square (1947) – Lottie
Anna Karenina (1948) – Princess Scherbatsky
Counterblast (1948) – Mrs. Cole
The Winslow Boy (1948) – Grace Winslow
Silent Dust (1949) – Lady Clandon
Little Big Shot (1952) – Mrs. Maddox
Always a Bride (1953) – Dowager
Out of the Clouds (1955) – Rich Woman
Escapade (1955) – Stella Hampden, Senior
On Such a Night (1956, Short) – Lady Falconbridge
A Town Like Alice (1956) – Mrs. Dudley Frost
Seven Waves Away (1957) – Dorothy Knudson
Small Hotel (1957) – Mrs. Samson-Fox
The Last Chronicle of Barset (1959, TV Series) – Lady Lufton
Carlton-Browne of the F.O. (1959) – Lady Carlton-Browne
The Plane Makers (1964, TV Series) – Geraldine Pettifur
Great Catherine (1968) – Dowager Lady Gorse (final film role)

The Noël Coward play Present Laughter was shown as a "Play of the Week" broadcast by ATV in 1967, Lohr appeared alongside Peter O'Toole and Honor Blackman.

References

Sources

External links

Australian film actresses
Australian silent film actresses
20th-century Australian actresses
Australian stage actresses
Australian child actresses
Actresses from Sydney
1890 births
1975 deaths
Burials at Brompton Cemetery
English film actresses
English stage actresses
English child actresses
20th-century English actresses
Australian emigrants to England
Australian expatriates in England
19th-century Australian women